Hefford is a surname. Notable people with the surname include:

Audrey Hefford (1929–2014), Australian lawn bowler
Brent Hefford (born 1978), New Zealand cricketer
Edward Hefford (1871–1955), British Royal Navy officer
Jayna Hefford (born 1977), Canadian ice hockey player

English-language surnames